Taj Charles is an Antigua and Barbudan football player. He has played for Antigua and Barbuda national team. He was born on 23 August 1977  in Antigua and Barbuda.

National team statistics

References

External links

1977 births
Living people
Antigua and Barbuda footballers
Antigua and Barbuda international footballers
Association football midfielders